The Cherai Gowreeshwara Temple is one of the main Hindu temples in Kerala State of South India. This temple is situated in the village of Cherai in the picturesque Vypeen island, sandwiched between the Arabian sea and the beautiful backwaters of Cochin. The temple is maintained by Vijnana Vardhini Sabha. This is the only temple in Asia that has a chathurmukha kovil (sanctum sanctorum with four deities facing east, west, north, and south). It is also known as Malayala Palani (മലയാള പഴനി) after the famous Subramanya Temple in Tamil Nadu. The main deity facing east is Subrahmanyan, but the temple is dedicated to the deity facing west, Sree Gowreeswaran or Lord Siva, one of the trinity of Gods in Hinduism and father of Subrahmanyan. The other deities are Parvathy, Siva's consort, and Ganapathy, the elder son, completing the family quartet of Lord Siva. The Gowreeshwara Temple festival is one of the main festivals in the Ernakulam district. The festival is conducted every year towards the end of January or early February. The main attractions are the Kavadi Utsavam in honor of the deity, Subramanian, and the Pooram, a magnificent display of caparisoned elephants, usually 25 to 30 in number. The temple was established by Sree Narayana Guru, saint and social reformer of Kerala, who fought against caste oppression and other social evils prevalent till the early twentieth century. The temple, right from its inception, was open to people of all castes and religions and is a living symbol of communal and religious harmony.

The other famous temple in Cherai is the Azheekkal Sree Varaha Temple, famous for its beautiful temple chariot, drawn on rails during the annual festival.

See also
 Temples of Kerala

Satellite image of the temple
Satellite image of the temple

Hindu temples in Ernakulam district